California's 5th State Assembly district is one of 80 California State Assembly districts. It is currently represented by Republican Joe Patterson of Rocklin.

District profile
The district encompasses the central Sierra Nevada, including most of the Gold Country. The district also contains a slice of the Central Valley.

All of Alpine County
 Markleeville

All of Amador County
 Amador City
 Ione
 Jackson
 Plymouth
 Sutter Creek

All of Calaveras County
 Angels Camp

El Dorado County – 65.9%
 Placerville
 South Lake Tahoe

All of Madera County
 Chowchilla
 Madera

All of Mariposa County
 Mariposa

All of Mono County
 Mammoth Lakes

Placer County – 5.8%
 Auburn
 Newcastle

All of Tuolumne County
 Sonora

Election results from statewide races

List of assembly members 
Due to redistricting, the 5th district has been moved around different parts of the state. The current iteration resulted from the 2011 redistricting by the California Citizens Redistricting Commission.

Election results 1992 - present

2020

2018

2016

}

2014

2012

2010

2008

2006

2004

2002

2000

1998

1996

1994

1993 (special)

1992

See also 
 California State Assembly
 California State Assembly districts
 Districts in California

References

External links 
 District map from the California Citizens Redistricting Commission

05
Sierra Nevada (United States)
Government of Alpine County, California
Government of Amador County, California
Government of Calaveras County, California
Government of El Dorado County, California
Government of Madera County, California
Government of Mariposa County, California
Government of Mono County, California
Government of Placer County, California
Government of Tuolumne County, California
Auburn, California
Madera, California
Placerville, California
Sonora, California
South Lake Tahoe, California